Kabud Kola (also Romanized as Kabūd Kolā) is a village in Feyziyeh Rural District, in the Central District of Babol County, Mazandaran Province, Iran. At the 2006 census, its population was 357, in 88 families.

References 

Populated places in Babol County